This is a list of crossings of the River Avon in England (including bridges, tunnels, ferries and fords), in order from its source in Northamptonshire, through or adjoining the counties of Leicestershire, Northamptonshire, Warwickshire, and Worcestershire, to its confluence with the River Severn at Tewkesbury in Gloucestershire.



Crossings

In order, moving downstream:

References 

Rivers of England
Bridges in England
Lists of bridges in the United Kingdom
Crossings in the United Kingdom by river